Kathleen Nolan (born Joycelyn Schrum, September 27, 1933) is an American actress and former president of the Screen Actors Guild. From 1957 to 1962, she played Kate McCoy, a housewife, on the television series The Real McCoys.

Early years
Born in St. Louis, Missouri, Nolan first appeared on stage on the showboat Goldenrod when she was 13 months old. She acted on the showboat for 12 years. Her family acted in tent shows and had their own troupe, the Circle Stock Company. She graduated from high school in St. Louis and sang on a radio station there.

Stage

On Broadway, Nolan played Wendy in the original production of the Styne-Comden-Green musical version of Peter Pan (1954–1955), starring Mary Martin and Cyril Ritchard, a role she repeated in both the 1955 and 1956 live NBC-TV broadcasts on Producers' Showcase. A 1960 version was produced for television broadcast, and converted to videotape, but it does not feature Nolan because she was then deemed too old. One of the earlier black-and-white versions, with Nolan’s revelatory, irrepressible performance, can be viewed by appointment at New York’s Paley Center. Both 1955 and 1956 TV broadcasts can be viewed on DVD releases from VAI - Video Artists International.

When Nolan was an usher at the Palace Theatre for Judy Garland’s show, word got backstage to  Garland that an usher (Nolan) could recreate her entire performance. Garland had, of course, never seen the show or her own staging, so she invited Nolan to perform the entire show while she sat in the house. Garland later recommended Nolan to the Peter Pan creators.

She played Amy in Love in E-Flat (1967).

Beyond Broadway, she "did major summer and winter theater ..."

Television and film

Nolan spent most of her career on television, making her debut in an episode of The Philco Television Playhouse. She had a regular role as the teenaged cousin Liz in the 1953–1954 sitcom Jamie, starring Brandon deWilde in the title role.

Nolan made other appearances over the years on such series as Gunsmoke, The Lloyd Bridges Show, The Millionaire, The Untouchables, Breaking Point, Crossing Jordan, Ally McBeal, Chicago Hope, All My Children, Jacqueline Susann's Valley of the Dolls, Murder, She Wrote (1991 episode "The Prodigal Father"), Magnum, P.I. (episodes "The Ugliest Dog in Hawaii" (1981) and "Double Jeopardy" (1982) (last one in which Larry Pennell guest starred), The Incredible Hulk, Quincy M.E., The Love Boat, Charlie's Angels, The Rockford Files, The Bionic Woman, Kolchak: The Night Stalker, Love, American Style, Bewitched, The Big Valley, The Alfred Hitchcock Hour, Thriller, Burke's Law, Meet McGraw, and Ben Casey.

Nolan appeared with fellow guest star Michael Landon in the 1958 episode "Rose of the Rio Bravo" on the series Tombstone Territory, starring Pat Conway and Richard Eastham. She also appeared on the interview program Here's Hollywood.

Nolan's best-known television role was as Kate, the wife of Luke McCoy (Richard Crenna), on the popular sitcom The Real McCoys. On February 23, 1961, she was thrown from a horse and injured during the filming of an episode. She then missed four months of work and was "in and out of the hospital many times" before returning to the series to perform in the episode broadcast on June 15, 1961. Nolan left The Real McCoys before its final season (1962-1963). At the time, the series also switched networks from ABC to CBS. The time slot for The Real McCoys changed as well in the switch to CBS, moving from Thursday evenings to Sunday evenings opposite NBC's Bonanza. In the revamped story for the series, Nolan's character was said to have died.

Nolan appeared on McHale's Navy, which resulted in her own spin-off series Broadside, in which she led a cast that included Edward Andrews, Dick Sargent, Sheila James (in her last regular television series role), Lois Roberts, Joan Staley, George Furth, Arnold Stang, and Jimmy Boyd. Broadside had good ratings, but Universal Studios dropped the series after a single season.

Beyond television, she appeared as Burt Reynolds's love Claudia in the 2017 film The Last Movie Star.

Awards
Nolan in 1980 received the Women in Film Crystal Award for outstanding women "who, through their endurance and the excellence of their work, have helped to expand the role of women within the entertainment industry".

In 1959, she was nominated for an Emmy Award for Best Supporting Actress (Continuing Character) in a Comedy Series for her work in The Real McCoys.

Other activities
Nolan served for two terms as the first female president of the Screen Actors Guild (1975–79). She also served on SAG's board of directors for a dozen years.

She is a life member of the Actors Studio and a recipient of the Women in Film Crystal Award. In 1978, President Jimmy Carter appointed Nolan to the board of the Corporation for Public Broadcasting.

Personal life
Nolan married Richard Heckenkamp, a "personal manager for celebrities", on November 4, 1962. They were divorced on May 19, 1965. They had a son, Spencer Garrett.

Filmography

Television

References

External links

 
 
 
 Screen Actors Guild biography

1933 births
American film actresses
American musical theatre actresses
American stage actresses
American television actresses
Presidents of the Screen Actors Guild
Living people
Actresses from St. Louis
Actresses from Los Angeles
American trade union leaders
Activists from California
21st-century American women